The MCW Rage Television Championship is a professional wrestling television championship owned by the MCW Pro Wrestling (MCW) promotion. The title was created and debuted on February 21, 2001 at a MCW live event. The current champion is ’Miami’ Mike Walker, who is in his first reign.

The inaugural champion was Gregory Martin, who defeated Ronnie Zukko in the finals of a tournament to win the championship on February 21, 2001 at an MCW live event.

Title history

Combined reigns

References
General

Specific

External links
MarylandWrestling.com
 MCW Rage Television Championship

MCW Pro Wrestling championships
Television wrestling championships